Pepita Laguarda Batet (1919–1936) was a Catalan militant anarchist. In 1936, after the outbreak of the Spanish Civil War, she was incorporated into the libertarian ranks without having yet reached adulthood. She died in Uesca at the age of seventeen, fighting against the nationalist forces that controlled the city.

Biography
Pepita Laguarda Batetlived was brought up in the industrial district of L'Hospitalet de Llobregat, just south-west of Barcelona. She joined the anarchists when still young and against the opinion of her family. Thus, she had to escape from her home in order to take up arms. In July 1936, she joined the militants in the fight against the military uprising in Barcelona. On 19 August, together with her boyfriend Juan Lopez Carvajal, she enlisted in the Ascaso Column and left for the Aragon front.

On 1 September she was seriously injured in the early morning while fighting near Uesca. When the wounded were removed from the front, the nationalist fire was directed at the Red Cross post. Laguarda was transferred first to the Vicién hospital and later to the Granyén Blood Hospital, where she died on 2 September at 9:30 a.m. Juan López Carvajal was the one who wrote the letter notifying the press of the death. The chronicles of the time describe her as an enthusiastic and courageous personality, who at all times knew how to maintain integrity and presence of mind, even on her deathbed.

References

1919 births
1936 deaths
Spanish anarchists
Anarchists from Catalonia
Women in war in Spain
Spanish military personnel of the Spanish Civil War (Republican faction)
Anarchist partisans
20th-century Spanish women
Women in the Spanish Civil War
Military personnel killed in the Spanish Civil War